The 2008–09 Guatemalan Liga Nacional season was the 10th season in which the Apertura and Clausura format was used.

The season was divided into two tournaments; the Apertura, which is played from August to December, and the Clausura, which is played from January to May. The first six clubs in the standings at the end of each competition participate in the playoffs (a two-leg knock-out phase) to determine the champion; the first and second place teams qualify directly to the semi-finals, while the other two have to play in the quarter-finals. The winners of the Apertura and Clausura tournaments participate in the 2009–10 CONCACAF Champions League.

Torneo Apertura

Top scorers

Final Update: December 1, 2008.

Results

Colors: Blue = home team win; White = draw; Red = away team win.

Playoffs

Comunicaciones as tournament champion qualified to the 2009–10 CONCACAF Champions League.

Torneo Clausura

Top scorers

Results

Colors: Blue = home team win; White = draw; Red = away team win.

Playoffs

Jalapa as tournament champion qualified to the 2009–10 CONCACAF Champions League.

Relegation

At the end of the season, the 10th placed team (the team with the fewest points) in the aggregate table standings (the combined standings of both the Apertura and Clausura tournaments) is relegated to the second division automatically at the end of the Clausura tournament.

Aggregate table

See also
Liga Nacional de Guatemala
2008–09 in Guatemalan football

References

External links
 Guatemala National Football Federation 
 Guatefutbol 
 RSSSF – Liga Nacional stats

Liga Nacional de Fútbol de Guatemala seasons
1
Guatemala